Samuel "Samu" Araújo Fernández (born 9 December 1995) is a Spanish professional footballer who plays as a left-back for Pontevedra CF.

Club career
Born in Vigo, Galicia, Samu played youth football with local Celta de Vigo, signing a new three-year deal on 12 July 2013. He made his senior debut with the B-team on 27 October 2013, starting in a 2–2 home draw against SD Logroñés in the Segunda División B.

Samu made his first-team debut on 14 January 2015, starting and playing the full 90 minutes in a 2–0 away win against Athletic Bilbao, in the season's Copa del Rey. On 9 July 2017 he moved to another reserve team, after agreeing to a one-year loan deal with FC Barcelona B.

On 21 June 2018, after featuring in only one match while on loan, Samu terminated his contract with Celta.

References

External links
FC Barcelona official profile

1995 births
Living people
Spanish footballers
Spanish expatriate footballers
Footballers from Vigo
Association football defenders
Segunda División players
Segunda División B players
Ekstraklasa players
Celta de Vigo B players
RC Celta de Vigo players
FC Barcelona Atlètic players
Atlético Madrid B players
Arka Gdynia players
Cultural Leonesa footballers
Pontevedra CF footballers
Spanish expatriate sportspeople in Poland
Expatriate footballers in Poland